Justin Hunter better known by his stage name Em Flach, is an Australian musician, producer and photographer. His debut single "Let It Fall" is his first release under the name Em Flach.

Biography 
Hunter was raised in Katoomba, New South Wales located in the Blue Mountains (New South Wales) of Australia. He began playing piano by studying the Japanese Suzuki method, until furthering his studies at the Sydney Conservatorium of Music located in Sydney, Australia. Much of his youth was spent playing local concert halls in Sydney before releasing his first album sip in 2004.

Career 
Hunter began creating music under the name Em Flach after drawing inspiration from his Grandmother, who lived in the Netherlands where she supported her husband who worked for the Dutch Resistance against the Nazi Regime. While he was still studying at the Conservatorium of Music, Em Flach began writing songs inspired by his hometown and the mountains surrounding it.

His first major hit, "Your Love" with DJ Kid Kenobi, reached #7 on the ARIA club charts. He has since performed alongside American singer-songwriter Ingrid Michaelson and Perth-based musician and producer Ta-Ku on Triple J's popular segment Like a Version and Spotify Live Sessions. He is currently collaborating with artists such as Allday, Kid Kenobi,
Hiatus Kaiyote singer, Jace Excel and Abbe May.

"Let It Fall" was the first track off of Flach's debut EP, #LDKS. It includes collaborations with Australian beat-maker Tomasz Charuk and the vocals of lead singer Kearna Murray  from Australian hip-hop outfit Peaks and the Japanese rapping poetry of DAG FORCE. Featured on the music blog acid ted it was labeled as, "classy downtempo hip hop. A delightfully melodic air to the track, with the right amount of swing."

Discography 
Let It Fall (2018) - Single
Feelings ft. Dag Force (2018) - Single

References

External links 
 Em Flach Instagram
 Em Flach

Date of birth missing (living people)
Living people
Australian hip hop musicians
Australian male singer-songwriters
Australian musicians
Australian photographers
Downtempo musicians
Musicians from New South Wales
Year of birth missing (living people)